Larry Pickett (born December 27, 1978) is an American television show creator, executive producer, host and editor.

Life and career 
Pickett also developed and produced the double disc CD "One Hot Minute: North Carolina Hip-Hop Compilation"Pickett was a key contributor to helping Chapel Hill, North Carolina based entertainment company Zoom Culture attract national and international attention by helping their flagship television show titled "Hip Hop Nation: Notes from the Underground" gain nationwide airplay and worldwide DVD distribution.Hip Hop Nation: Notes from the underground, created by Kevin Thomas and Sue Herzog and sponsored by Universal Records aired in over 25 million homes in the United States on various stations across the country.Hip Hop Nation also aired overseas on MTV Base which is available in the United Kingdom, France, Belgium, Luxembourg, Switzerland, the Republic of Ireland, Kenya and South Africa. The channel was previously available in the Netherlands, Germany and other European countries but was replaced by MTV Dance in some territories from March 2008. All though Hip Hop Nation: Notes from the underground no longer airs on television it can still be found in DVD format worldwide (with a concentration in the USA, Italy and France) through a distribution deal with Xenon Pictures/Universal Music & Video Distribution/

Lastly, "The Larry Pickett Show" was the highest rated show on Raleigh's Time Warner Cable Access. Pickett was also an on-air radio talent on WQOK-FM (K97.5) in Raleigh, NC. The shows he produced/hosted consistently dominated the ratings* in their time slots over shows like the legendary Apollo TV show and other shows including Blind Date, Hot Ticketand Elimidate. (* Nielsen Media Research, DMA 29) more than doubling the ratings of their closest competitors.

Pickett is known for his "LP Exclusives", because he gets exclusive interviews with the stars. Record labels relied on Pickett to help them break their new artists in the Carolinas. Pickett has interviewed many celebrities in his career, ranging from WWE superstars, actors, comedians and literally hundreds of musicians, from Melissa Etheridge and P!nk to Babyface, DMX and Ludacris.

Pickett has been seen on MTV, BET and Fox News Channel. He has also been featured in national publications including Billboard Magazine, The Source Magazine, Vibe Magazine, Broadcasting & Cable Magazine and XXL Magazine as well as the cover story for Praxis Magazine.

Pickett started in television production at Buffum Elementary in Long Beach, California.

When he first moved to North Carolina, he attended Ligon Middle School, and then went on to Athens Drive High School in Raleigh. 

Pickett stayed in TV3 for four straight years and took on the role of Executive Producer his junior and senior year. WRAL-TV5 did a series on him called "College Bound". WRAL followed Pickett through his senior year and did an update on him around every three months.

Pickett started his quest to be a television personality at the studios of Community Television in Raleigh. Pickett was working as a cameraman on a live call in TV show on Time Warner Cable, when one day the host didn't show up. Ian Yack was the producer of the show and knew that Pickett had experience as a host, so he asked him to fill in. He was invited to be a co-host on the show. The crew parted ways a year and a half later.

References

American television hosts
Athens Drive High School alumni
Television producers from New York City
Living people
1978 births
People from Queens, New York